Stuka (foaled February 23, 1990 in Kentucky) is an American Thoroughbred racehorse best known for winning the Grade I Santa Anita Handicap at Santa Anita Park in Arcadia, California.

Bred and raced by Allen Paulson, Stuka's sire was the multiple Grade 1 winner, Jade Hunter, his dam was Caerleon's Success, a daughter of Caerleon, the 1988 and 1991 Leading sire in Great Britain and Ireland.

Stuka was trained by Gary Jones.

Retired after the 1994 racing season, Stuka was sold to South American interests and has had a successful career at stud in Chile where he stands at Haras Don Alberto. As at October 30, 2011 he has sired  45 stakes winners.

Pedigree

References

1990 racehorse births
Thoroughbred family 2-n
Racehorses bred in Kentucky
Racehorses trained in the United States